Hari Raya songs (also known as Lagu Raya in Malay) are Malays Eid ul Fitr songs.

Popular Hari Raya albums by major discographies

EMI
16 Lagu Lagu Hari Raya Aidil Fitri (16 Eid ul Fitr songs) (P) 1982 EMI (Malaysia) Sdn Bhd
Selamat Hari Raya Aidilfitri (Happy Eid-Ul-Fitr) (P) 1973 EMI (Singapore) Pte Ltd
Gempaq Raya (P) 1998 EMI (Malaysia) Sdn Bhd
Citarasa Emas Aidilfitri (P) 1992 EMI (Malaysia) Sdn Bhd
Bergembira Di Hari Raya (P) 1977 EMI (Malaysia) Sdn Bhd
Selamat Hari Raya Aidilfitri (2003 Version) (P) 2003 EMI (Malaysia) Pte Ltd
Album Hari Raya (P) 1981 EMI (Malaysia) Sdn Bhd...
Bersama Di Hari Raya (P) 1985 EMI (Malaysia) Sdn Bhd

Warner Music
Aidilfitri Bermaaf-Maafan
Gilang Gemilang Di Aidilfitri
Hari Raya by Raihan

BMG
Raya Punya

Domo Records
The Light Of The Spirit

Sony Music
Warna Warni Aidilfitri

SonyBMG
Satu Hari Di Hari Raya (1994)
Kemeriahan Di Hari Raya (1996)

Radical Records
Rasa Nikmat Syawal

List of popular Hari Raya songs

EMI
Saloma - "Selamat Hari Raya"
P. Ramlee - "Dendang Perantau"
Fazidah Joned - "Selamat Hari Raya"
Ahmad Jais - "Selamat Hari Raya"
Sanisah Huri - "Aidilfitri"
Rafeah Buang - "Bila Takbir Bergema"
Junainah M Amin - "Suasana Riang (Di Hari Raya)"
Sanisah Huri - "Bersabarlah Sayang"
Sharifah Aini - "Hari Yang Mulia"
Sharifah Aini - "Suasana Hari Raya"
Uji Rashid & Hail Amir - "Seloka Hari Raya"
D J Dave - "Menjelang Hari Raya"
Halil Chik feat. Trio Manja - "Lenggang Mak Limah"
Sudirman - "Dari Jauh Ku Pohon Maaf"
Aman Shah - "Kepulangan Yang Dinanti"
Black Dog Bone - "Cahaya Aidilfitri"
Noorkumalasari - "Pulang Di Hari Raya"
Anuar & Ellina - "Suasana Di Hari Raya"
Gaya Zakri - "Ucap Selamat Hari Raya"
Sharifah Aini - "Nostalgia Aidilfitri"
Rosemaria - "Di Pagi Aidilfitri"
Khairil Johari Johar - "Sepasang Kurung Biru"
Gaya Zakri, D J Dave & Rosemaria - "Senandung Hari Raya"
Cenderawasih - "Bersama Di Hari Raya"
Sweet September - "Hari Raya Tetap Tiba"
Sheila Majid - "Hari Mulia"
Rahimah Rahim - "Selamat Berhari Raya"
P. Ramlee/D J Dave - "Suara Takbir"
M Nasir - "Satu Hari Di Hari Raya"
Mamat Exist - "Ku Pohon Restu"
Dikir Temasek - "Bergema Suara Takbir"
Dayang Ku Intan - "Senandung Hari Raya Untukmu"

Warner Music
Uji Rashid & Hail Amir - "Pengertian Hari Raya"
Jamal Abdillah - "Salam Aidilfitri"

BMG
Awie & Ziana Zain - "Halaman Asmara"
Awie & Ziana Zain - "Sensasi Hari Raya" (theme song for Salem raya commercial)
Ramlah Ram - Cahaya Aidilfitri
Nurul - Rindu Syahdu Di Hari Raya
Ziana Zain - Indah Di Hari Raya
Mamat Exist- Ku Pohon Restu Ayah Bonda

Domo Records
Kitaro - "The Field"

Sony Music
Aishah - "Pulanglah"
Amy Mastura - "Setahun Sekali"
Warna Warni Aidilfitri - "Nyanyian Ramai"

Radical Records
Acam asad - "Rasa Nikmat Syawal"

References

Bruneian culture
Malay culture
Malaysian culture
Singaporean culture